Lualenyi Ranch is a private group ranch in Kenya. The ranch is located in Taita-Taveta County next to the Tsavo West National Park and Taita Hills Wildlife Sanctuary. It has been leased from the government for 99 years. Lualenyi Ranch is part of the LUMO Community Wildlife Sanctuary with Oza and Mramba ranches.

References

Agriculture companies of Kenya
Companies with year of establishment missing
Taita-Taveta County